Senator Crandall may refer to:

Rich Crandall (born 1967), Arizona State Senate
Chester Crandell (1946–2014), Arizona State Senate